The following is a list of Basque exonyms, that is to say Basque-language names for places that do not speak Basque.

Algeria

Austria

Azerbaijan

Belgium

Canada

Chad

China

Cyprus

Czech Republic

Denmark

Egypt

France

Germany

Greece

Guinea-Conakry

India

Iran

Iraq

Israel

Italy

Lebanon

Libya

Mauritania

Mongolia

Morocco

Nepal

Netherlands

Palestine

Poland

Romania

Russia

Saudi Arabia

Serbia

South Africa

Spain

Sri Lanka

Switzerland

Syria

Thailand

Ukraine

United Arab Emirates

United Kingdom

United States

Uzbekistan

Venezuela

References

See also

List of European exonyms

Basque language
Basque